The de Galard family is  a substitute family of the French nobility originating from Condom in Gascony.

Origin 
According to J. Noulens, the Galard family takes its name from the seigneury of Galard or Goalard, the first barony of Condomois. It comes from the Counts of Condomois themselves from the Dukes of Gascony. The first known member of this family who took the name of Galard is Garcie Arnaud, baron de Galard, born around 995, who signed a charter on January 12, 1062 with Hugues and Hunald de Gabarret.

Genealogy
The current branches of the de Galard family are:

Senior branch:
de Galard Terraube
de Galard L'Isle
de Galard Magnas

Cadet branch:
de Galard de Béarn
de Galard de Brassac
de Galard de Béarn de Brassac

Personalities 
Gustave de Galard (1777-1840)
René de Galard de Béarn (1699-1771)
Geneviève de Galard (born 1925), French nurse

Possessions
Castle of Terraube
Castle of Blanzaguet
Castle of Miremont

Notes

References

Bibliography
French noble families